The Wabana Group is a group cropping out on Bell Island, Newfoundland.

Ordovician Newfoundland and Labrador